The 1933 George Washington Colonials football team was an American football team that represented George Washington University as an independent during the 1933 college football season. In its fifth season under head coach Jim Pixlee, the team compiled a 5–3–1 record and outscored opponents by a total of 125 to 51. The team defeated Auburn, tied with Clemson, and lost to Tennessee, Tulsa, and Kansas.

Schedule

References

George Washington
George Washington Colonials football seasons
George Washington Colonials football